The Pinellas Suncoast Transit Authority (PSTA) is a government agency that provides public transportation for Pinellas County, Florida. The authority manages a fixed-route bus system that encompasses over 40 bus routes - including two express routes to Tampa; the Central Avenue Trolley; the Suncoast Beach Trolley; and the bus rapid transit service, the SunRunner.

History
PSTA's roots trace back to the early 1900s as the St. Petersburg Municipal Transit System (SPMTS). The system began with a streetcar line to Gulfport and eight buses to run several routes throughout the St. Pete area. Unlike the advent and expansion of Tampa's original streetcar system, the Gulfport streetcar only encompassed 23 miles of track along its singular line. However, the line proved to be popular amongst area residents during its heyday. In 1928, the entire SPMTS system carried 4.2 million customers, marking a major milestone for the agency. As the 1930s came and went, streetcar usage began to decline - as was the case nationwide. By 1949, the streetcar line had closed, marking the end of streetcar service in Pinellas County as a whole.

Despite the demise of the Gulfport trolley, bus service throughout Pinellas County continued to expand throughout the 1940s, 50s, and 60s. In 1970, the Central Pinellas Transit Authority (CPTA) was formed, serving the Clearwater area and northern Pinellas. The agency was fully established by 1973 and operated 9 routes with a fleet of 21 buses. The CPTA saw 900,000 riders in its first year of service. In 1975, SPMTS begins paratransit services and both agencies continue to expand their fleet. In 1978, tourist trolley service (using trolley-replica buses) began in downtown St. Petersburg and became successful. By the 1980s, the two agencies formed a cooperative agreement, which allowed the expansion of routes throughout Pinellas County. This agreement also led to the creation of a single customer service phone number. In October 1984, the two companies formally merged (via an act of the Florida Legislature) to create the PSTA. In the years following their merger, PSTA operated nearly 80 routes with a fleet or nearly 130 buses. The agency begins installing electronic fareboxes and completed its central Pinellas operations center, as well as several bus terminals. In 1990, PSTA obtained its first express route, previously operated by Hillsborough Area Regional Transit (HART). Also in 1990, PSTA established a cross-county bus route via US 19. Further expansion of bus service continued through the 1990s and 2000s; with the construction of bus terminals at Williams Park in Downtown St. Petersburg (opening in 1994) and the Central Plaza Terminal (now known as Grand Central Station) in the Grand Central District off Central Ave near US 19 (opening in 2002). The agency introduced electronic fare cards (GO Cards) in 1996, as well as accelerated replacement of outdated buses. In 2001, the Suncoast Beach Trolley began service along the gulf coast beaches and in 2003, PSTA purchased a fleet of commuter buses to operate its express routes. A year later, PSTA and HART introduced an intersystem Passport to allow customers to use each other's systems for a single monthly fare. In 2005, PSTA relocated all of its operations to a single, unified facility in northern St. Petersburg - near Ulmerton Rd and Roosevelt Blvd. In 2006, HART and PSTA agreed to honor each other's reduced fare photo permits.

From the late 2000s onward, PSTA began purchasing diesel-electric hybrid buses and attempted to bring forth further expanded bus service, as well as premium transit service such as Bus Rapid Transit or Light Rail Transit to Pinellas County. This began with a Memorandum of Understanding (MOU) between the agency, the Tampa Bay Area Regional Transit Authority (TBARTA), the Florida Department of Transportation (FDOT), and the Pinellas County Metropolitan Planning Organization (MPO) to conduct an Alternatives Analysis of transit corridors in Pinellas County. This was then followed up by a series of public engagement sessions and eventually the failed attempt in 2014 by Pinellas County to pass a sales tax referendum (Greenlight Pinellas). In 2012, the agency launched the North County Connector flex-route van service, allowing customers in areas of northern Pinellas to have access to transit service - including those in neighborhoods by which regular transit buses have difficulty accessing or where a traditional fixed bus route would have lower ridership projections. The three routes have since been modified to serve areas with demand for the service.

In 2017, PSTA began Direct Connect, which allows customers to summon a ride via taxi or ride share to connect to or from a designated stop or bus terminal . In 2018, a partnership between PSTA, HART, Pasco County Public Transportation, and transit agencies in Hernando, Manatee, and Sarasota counties began working on a regional fare collection system called Flamingo Fares Tampa Bay. This system would allow customers to use either a smartphone app or a smart card to tap a reader device and pay for their transit fares in a seamless, contactless manner. While Manatee County was involved in the initial phase of the program, county officials decided to leave the project in pursuit of a different fare collection vendor. The same year, PSTA announced that it would partner with Transit App to help provide real-time bus arrival predictions and eventually other features to customers via the use of smartphones. The agency also introduced its first two battery electric buses - produced by BYD, and revamped Route 300X to serve Tampa International Airport on most trips.

In 2018, PSTA pushed ahead with planning for what would become the SunRunner, with planning for the project reaching 60% completion by September, 2019. The SunRunner branding was formally unveiled in 2020, along with the project groundbreaking. Despite delays in the project - partly due to the COVID-19 pandemic, the SunRunner opened to customers on October 21, 2022 to great fanfare.

Bus routes
PSTA operates 38 routes (including one limited express route) that traverse Pinellas County and 2 express routes that connect into downtown Tampa.

Local

Express services

Trolley Services
PSTA operates two fixed-route trolley services using trolley-replica buses - the Central Ave Trolley (CAT) and the Suncoast Beach Trolley (SBT). The CAT traverses Central Ave between Downtown St. Pete's Pier District and St. Pete Beach (the Pinellas County Beach Access at 4700 Gulf Blvd) while the SBT traverses Gulf Blvd between Clearwater Beach and St. Pete Beach (the latter also serves Downtown Clearwater via the Memorial Causeway Bridge).

The CAT and SBT connect with each other in northern St. Pete Beach (at the 75th Ave transfer point). The CAT connects to other PSTA routes along Central Ave - including at Grand Central Station and Downtown St. Pete. The SBT connects to Route 59 in Indian Rocks Beach, Route 68 at Johns Pass, and other routes in Clearwater.

North County Connector
The North County Connector was originally launched in 2012 and was modeled off of HART's HART Flex service. The sub-network used cutaway vans to access areas of northern Pinellas County that would be otherwise inaccessible to standard transit buses. The three original routes consisted of Route 811 - serving the eastern Lake Tarpon area, Route 812 - serving Oldsmar and Town-N-Country, and Route 813 - serving Palm Harbor. Route 811 was eliminated in 2015 due to low usage. In 2016, service to Safety Harbor was added in part due to the rerouting of Route 62. This eventually led to the creation of Route 814 in 2016.

In 2019, the routes were restructured to become standard fixed routes. However, the 800-series route numbers were kept due to the continuation of the routes being operated by cutaway vans.

SunRunner BRT
Since 2009, PSTA has been planning some form of Bus Rapid Transit service to better serve customers along higher-ridership corridors. The first area of focus is the 1st Ave N/1st Ave S and Pasadena Ave corridors to allow customers a faster trip between Downtown St. Pete and St. Pete Beach. In the mid 2010s, concrete plans were presented for the county's first BRT route utilizing the aforementioned corridors. In 2019, the SunRunner name was given to the project and construction began in 2020. The SunRunner launched in October 2022.

The SunRunner route operates on fifteen-minute intervals everyday from 6:00 a.m. to 8:00 p.m., and in thirty-minute intervals thereafter until midnight, using 40' Gillig BRT Plus buses. The 1st Ave N, 1st Ave S, and Pasadena Ave corridors will utilize dedicated bus lanes with stylized stations. Along Gulf Blvd, stylized stations will be placed but buses will operate in mostly mixed traffic.

Bus Hubs/Transit Centers

 Grand Central Station - Downtown St. Petersburg - Serving Routes: 5, 7, 9, 11, 14, 15, 18, 34, 52, 52LX, 79, 90, CAT (Also serving Downtown St. Pete are Routes 4, 14, 16, 20, 23, 32, 79, 100X, Looper
 Park Street Terminal - Downtown Clearwater - Serving Routes: 18, 52, 52LX, 60, 61, 65, 66L, 67, 73, 76, 78, Jolly Trolley, SBT
 Tyrone Square Mall - Serving Routes: 5, 7, 18, 20, 22, 23, 38, 62, 68, 73, 75, 79
 Westfield Countryside - Serving Routes: 19, 61, 62, 67, 76, 78, DPC, OTC, SHC
 Gateway Mall - Serving Routes: 4, 9, 16, 58, 74, 75, 100X
 Pinellas Park Transit Center - Serving Routes: 11, 34, 52, 52LX, 74, 75
 Serves as a stop for Greyhound.
 PSTA 34th Street Transfer Center - Serving Routes: 4, 11, 52, 52LX, 59
 Largo Transit Center - Serving Routes: 19, 34, 52, 52LX, 79
 Ulmerton Park-n-Ride - Serving Routes: 59, 300X
 Largo Mall - Serving Routes: 18, 59
 Seminole Shopping Center - Serving Routes: 18, 58, 65, 74
 Indian Rocks Shopping Center - Serving Routes: 59, 61, 65
 Clearwater Beach Transit Center - Serving Routes: SBT, Jolly Trolley

Connection to PCPT
In addition to the cross-bay express routes, PSTA also provides connections to Pasco County Public Transportation (PCPT) bus routes 18 and 19 via PSTA routes 19 and 66.

Active Fleet
PSTA operates a fleet of 210 transit buses. The bus fleet consists of a fleet of Gillig Low Floor and BRT buses as well as BYD buses. They are powered by clean diesel, diesel-electric hybrid, and battery-electric. All buses are being equipped with barrier shields in the operator area.

Transit Fixed-Route Buses

Trolley Replicas

Future Orders

Retired Fleet

References

External links
 
Tampa Bay Transit

Bus transportation in Florida
 
Transit agencies in Florida
1984 establishments in Florida